The Attorney General's Chambers of Anguilla is responsible for the following:

 Legal Adviser to the Government, Departments, Statutory Boards and Corporations
 Prosecute criminal cases on behalf of the Crown
 Represent the Government in civil actions by and against the Crown
 Advise the Royal Anguilla Police Force regarding investigations and prosecutions
 Draft legislation
 Law revision
 Law reform

Anguilla seceded from Saint Kitts and Nevis and became a British Crown colony in December 1980. Before then, the Attorney General was identified as representing "St. Christopher [Kitts], Nevis and Anguilla." Even by the time Anguilla passed a new constitution in 1982, certain records still showed the same title for the Attorney General.

List of attorneys general (Post-1980 upon becoming a territory) 

 Fitzroy Bryant (1979) [referred to as the Attorney General of St. Christopher, Nevis and Anguilla]
Tapley Seaton (1980-1982) [referred to as the Attorney General of St. Christopher, Nevis and Anguilla]
Alan Hoole (1983-1985)
 Howard Morrison (1988-1989)
 Alan Hoole (1989-1990)
Kurt de Freitas (1991-1992)
 Patrick Patterson (1993-1994)
Kurt de Freitas (1995-1996)
 Ronald Scipio (1997-2006)
 Wilhelm Bourne (2006-2010)
 James Wood (2011-2014)*
 Rupert Jones (2014-2016)
 John McKendrick (2016-2018)*
Dwight Horsford (2018-present)

*Ivor Greene was the Acting Attorney General during 2013 and 2017.

See also 

 Justice ministry
 Politics of Anguilla

References 

 
Justice ministries
Attorneys general